Five Minutes More is a children's television series co-produced between Australia and the United Kingdom. It was produced by Snow River Media and Buster Dandy Productions, and developed by The Jim Henson Company. The series premiered on ABC on 23 August 2006. Broadcast on the Smile in United States of America.

Synopsis 
The show starts off with one of the five animals telling a story: Faraway, an aardvark; Georgie, a penguin; Florrie, a dog; Sam, a monkey; and Louisa, a polar bear. Each story has a moral to it.

Production 
All of the characters are puppets originally designed by Playhouse Disney Asia in the South East Asia, and built by Solution Studios. All sets are cardboard and costumes are made with quilt fabric the same type on the bed they sit on telling these stories. The quilt is specially made with square pictures mostly based on a stories that is about to or has been already told. The series was shot in eight weeks in Australia, and dubbed in Britain.

Episodes

DVDs 

 Five Minutes More – The Very Best Present
 Five Minutes More – The Best Birthday Party Ever
 Five Minutes More – Bingle Bongle Boo
 Five Minutes More – Make Me A Rainbow
 Five Minutes More – All Together Now
 Five Minutes More – Magic of Music
 Five Minutes More – Volume One
 Five Minutes More – Bumper Pack Two Disc Collection

References

External links 

2006 Australian television series debuts
Australian Broadcasting Corporation original programming
Disney Channel original programming
Sentient toys in fiction
Australian television shows featuring puppetry
British television shows featuring puppetry
Television series by The Jim Henson Company
Australian children's television series
English-language television shows
2000s British children's television series
2006 British television series debuts